The Arctic Climate Impact Assessment (ACIA) is a study describing the ongoing climate change in the Arctic and its consequences: rising temperatures, loss of sea ice, unprecedented melting of the Greenland ice sheet, and many impacts on ecosystems, animals, and people. The ACIA is the first comprehensively researched, fully referenced, and independently reviewed evaluation of Arctic climate change and its impacts for the region and for the world. The project was guided by the intergovernmental Arctic Council and the non-governmental International Arctic Science Committee. Three hundred scientists participated in the study over a span of three years.

The 140-page synthesis report Impacts of a Warming Arctic was released in November 2004, and the scientific report later in 2005.

The ACIA Secretariat is located at the International Arctic Research Center at the University of Alaska Fairbanks.

Subsequent studies
The NOAA State of the Arctic Report 2006 updates some of the records of the ACIA report.   Taken collectively, the observations presented in the NOAA report show convincing evidence of a sustained period of warm temperature anomalies in the Arctic, supported by continued reduction in sea ice extent, observed at both the winter maximum and summer minimum, and widespread changes in Arctic vegetation. The warming trend is tempered somewhat by shifts in the spatial patterns of land temperatures and ocean salinity and temperature. While there are still large region to region and multiyear shifts in the Arctic climate, the large spatial extent of recent changes in air temperature, sea ice, and vegetation is greater than observed in the 20th century. The NOAA report is a review of environmental conditions during the past five years relative to those in the latter part of the 20th century, conducted by an international group of twenty scientists who developed a consensus on information content and reliability.

As an annual follow-on activity to the 2006 NOAA State of the Arctic report, the National Oceanic and Atmospheric Administration's Arctic Report Card presents annually updated, peer-reviewed information on recent observations of environmental conditions in the Arctic  relative to historical records.  The conclusion for 2010 is that a return to previous Arctic conditions is unlikely.  Record temperatures across Canadian Arctic and Greenland, a reduced summer sea ice cover, record snow cover decreases and links to some Northern Hemisphere weather support this conclusion.

In April 2008, the World Wildlife Fund's report, Arctic Climate Impact Science – An Update Since ACIA was launched at the meeting of the Arctic Council.  It provides a large, updated review of Arctic climate impact science since the 2005 ACIA. The full report can be freely downloaded from the WWF web site.

Arctic Biodiversity Assessment

ACIA called for improved capacity to monitor and understand changes in the Arctic and to improve and enhance long-term Arctic biodiversity monitoring. In response to this recommendation the Conservation of Arctic Flora & Fauna (CAFF) The Working Group of the Arctic Council has embarked upon the Arctic Biodiversity Assessment.  The ABA will be used to identify gaps in the data record, identify the main stressors and key mechanisms driving change.  It will synthesize existing data and research on Arctic biodiversity to form a baseline which will provide policy makers and conservation managers with a synthesis of the most current scientific research and traditional ecological knowledge.  It will provide a much needed description of the current state of the Arctic's ecosystems and biodiversity.  The ABA will serve as a baseline for use in global and regional assessments of Arctic biodiversity and form a key piece in the process of understanding what is happening and focusing efforts on those areas where it is most needed.  The availability of such information in an easily accessible format will be of great value to the governments, organisations, and peoples of the Arctic region in their struggle to ensure the sustainability of arctic biodiversity and arctic communities.

Circumpolar Biodiversity Monitoring Program

In further response to the ACIA call for better monitoring CAFF has established the Circumpolar Biodiversity Monitoring Program (CBMP).  The CBMP is an international network of scientists, government agencies, Indigenous organizations and conservation groups working together to harmonize and integrate efforts to monitor the Arctic's living resources.  Its goal is to facilitate more rapid detection, communication, and response with respect to the significant biodiversity-related trends and pressures affecting the circumpolar world.  The CBMP is the cornerstone program of the Arctic Council's Conservation of Arctic Flora and Fauna Working Group.

See also
Climate change in Canada
Climate of the Arctic
Arctic cooperation and politics

References

External links
Arctic Climate Impact Assessment 
RealClimate - an examination of the climate skeptic's charges against the ACIA

Climatological research
Environmental impact assessment
Arctic research